Hendrik "Henk" Kersken (6 January 1880, Bergen op Zoom – 3 December 1967, Harlingen) was a sailor from the Netherlands, who represented his native country at the 1928 Summer Olympics in Amsterdam. Kersken, as crew member on the Dutch 8 Metre Hollandia, took the 2nd place with helmsman Johannes van Hoolwerff and fellow crew members: Lambertus Doedes, Cornelis van Staveren, Gerard de Vries Lentsch and Maarten de Wit.

Sources
 
 
 

1880 births
1967 deaths
Sportspeople from Bergen op Zoom
Dutch male sailors (sport)

Sailors at the 1928 Summer Olympics – 8 Metre
Olympic sailors of the Netherlands
Medalists at the 1928 Summer Olympics
Olympic medalists in sailing
Olympic silver medalists for the Netherlands
20th-century Dutch people